Glucan endo-1,2-beta-glucosidase (endo-1,2-beta-glucanase, beta-D-1,2-glucanase, endo-(1->2)-beta-D-glucanase, 1,2-beta-D-glucan glucanohydrolase) is an enzyme with systematic name 2-beta-D-glucan glucanohydrolase. This enzyme catalyses the following chemical reaction

 Random hydrolysis of (1->2)-glucosidic linkages in (1->2)-beta-D-glucans

References

External links 
 

EC 3.2.1